Ludvig Schytte (28 April 1848 in Aarhus – 10 November 1909 in Berlin) was a Danish composer, pianist, and teacher.

Born in Aarhus, Denmark, Schytte originally trained as a pharmacist. He studied with Niels Gade and Edmund Neupert. In 1884, he travelled to Germany to study with Franz Liszt. Schytte lived and taught in Vienna between 1886 and 1907 and spent the last two years of his life teaching in Berlin. His daughter Anna Schytte was also a composer and pianist.

Schytte composed a Piano Concerto in C-sharp minor, Opus 28, and a Sonata in B-flat, among numerous other piano works. He also wrote two operas: Hero (25 September 1898 in Copenhagen) and Der Mameluk (22 December 1903 in Vienna). His shorter works are still used today as educational studies for piano students.

Literature 
School of modern pianoforte virtuosity (Schule des höheren Klavierspiels: technische Studien bis zur höchsten Ausbildung). Edited by Moriz Rosenthal and Ludvig Schytte. Berlin, ca. 1890.
Die Schule des modernen Klavierspiels ... School of Modern Pianoforte Playing. A Collection of Studies as Introduction to Modern Harmony, Melody, Rhythm and Style. Op. 174, etc. London: A. Lengnick & Co, 1912.

References

External links
 

1848 births
1909 deaths
19th-century classical composers
19th-century classical pianists
19th-century Danish composers
19th-century male musicians
20th-century classical composers
20th-century classical pianists
20th-century Danish composers
20th-century Danish male musicians
Danish classical composers
Danish classical pianists
Danish male classical composers
Danish opera composers
Danish Romantic composers
Male classical pianists
Male opera composers
People from Aarhus